Cernache do Bonjardim is a former civil parish in the municipality of Sertã, central Portugal. In 2013, the parish merged into the new parish Cernache do Bonjardim, Nesperal e Palhais. The population in 2011 was 3,052, in an area of 71.59 km2.

The Portuguese hero Nuno Álvares Pereira was born in Cernache do Bonjardim on 24 June 1360.

The parish includes the following villages:
Brejo da Correia 
Calvaria 
Carvalhos 
Cernache do Bonjardim 
Escudeiros 
Matos 
Mendeira 
Pampilhal 
Pinheiro da Aldeia Velha 
Porto dos Fusos 
Quintã 
Roda 
Sambado 
Várzea de Pedro Mouro

References

Populated places established in 1544
Freguesias of Sertã
Former parishes of Portugal
1544 establishments in Portugal